Thomas Thomson Paterson (1909–1994) was a Scottish archaeologist, palaeontologist, geologist, glaciologist, geographer, anthropologist, ethnologist, sociologist, and world authority on administration. He was curator of the Museum of Archaeology and Anthropology in Cambridge from 1937 to 1948.

Life

Paterson was born in Buckhaven in Fife on 29 September 1909, and was educated at Buckhaven High School. He studied science at the University of Edinburgh graduating with a BSc.

He gained his doctorate (PhD) at the University of Cambridge and became a Fellow of Trinity College.

In the 1930s Paterson participated in several Arctic expeditions, during which time collected many string figures, leading to his 1949 article, "Eskimo String Figures and Their Origin," Acta Arctica 3:1-98. He also participated in expeditions to East Africa, India, Greenland and Northern Canada.

In 1937 he was elected a Fellow of the Royal Society of Edinburgh. His proposers were Thomas James Jehu, Gordon Childe, James Pickering Kendall, and Thomas Matthew Finlay.

A trouble-shooter for the Royal Air Force during the Second World War, after which he studied industrial relations in the British National Coal Board in detail.

While at the University of Glasgow in the Department of Social and Economic Research he founded Methectics, now Methexis. He then transferred to the University of Strathclyde and built its School of Administration to the largest in Europe. He spent time researching in South Africa before moving to Canada.

He died on 9 April 1994 at Lions Gate Hospital in Vancouver in Canada.

Bibliography
Morale in War and Work: An experiment in the management of men (1955). Max Parrish, London
Management Theory (1966). Business Publications Limited, London.
Job Evaluation: Volume 1 - A New Method (1972). Business Books Limited, London.
Job Evaluation: Volume 2 - A Manual for the Paterson Method (1972). Business Books Limited, London.

Family

In 1938 he married Elna Johanne Hygen.
He had two children,Dr Erik Paterson and Kirsty Paterson.

Further reading
Paterson, Dr. E. T. (1996). "Thomas Thomson Paterson (obit.)", Yearbook of the Royal Society of Edinburgh, 1289.

References

1909 births
1994 deaths
String figures
British archaeologists
British geographers
People from Fife
Alumni of the University of Edinburgh
Academics of the University of Strathclyde
Fellows of the Royal Society of Edinburgh
20th-century archaeologists
20th-century geographers